At least six special routes of U.S. Route 18 have existed.

Existing

Mason City business loop

U.S. Highway 18 Business (US 18 Business) begins at a diamond interchange with Interstate 35 (I-35) on the eastern edge of Clear Lake. The route, overlapped by Iowa Highway 122 (Iowa 122), begins as a four-lane divided highway, serving the Mason City Municipal Airport before entering Mason City proper. Between Eisenhower and Jefferson Avenues in Mason City, the highway is undivided. This road is the primary east–west artery through Mason City. At Jefferson Avenue, US 18 Business / Iowa 122 separate into a pair of one-way streets, remaining in this configuration through the downtown area where the Park Inn Hotel, one of Frank Lloyd Wright's few commercial buildings, resides. They intersect US 65 at Federal Street. US 18 Business turns to the south to follow US 65. The business loop rejoins its parent route south of the city limits.

Marquette–McGregor business loop

U.S. Highway 18 Business (US 18 Business) begins at an intersection with US 18 west of McGregor. The route descends into the Mississippi River valley along the northern border of Pikes Peak State Park and then turns into McGregor. Through McGregor, US 18 Business heads to the northeast towards the Mississippi River. Along the river, the highway is parallel to the Dakota, Minnesota and Eastern Railroad (DM&E Railroad). For , US 18 Business travels a narrow strip of land between the river and the bluffs where it passes a riverboat casino. At Marquette, US 18 Business ends at the foot of the Marquette–Joliet Bridge, which carries US 18 to Prairie du Chien, Wisconsin.

Mount Horeb business loop

U.S. Highway 18 Business (US 18 Business) is a former segment of US 18/151 between Exits 65 and 69 within Mount Horeb.  The route is also shared by US 151 Business, as well as parts of Wisconsin Highway 78 and Dane County Road ID.

Verona business loop

U.S. Highway 18 Business (US 18 Business) is a former segment of US 18/151 within Verona.  The route is also shared by US 151 Business and Dane County Road MV. US 18 Business/151 Business/CR MV begins at a pair of flyover interchanges with US 18/151 on Exit 76 west of Verona. Eastbound Exit 76 runs directly into the business routes on West Verona Avenue, while westbound Exit 76 connects to the business routes by way of Epic Lane. From there, the business routes run east-northeast as a four-lane divided highway until the intersection with Legion Street, where it becomes a local two-lane undivided road. At the intersection with North and South Main Streets (Dane County Road M), West Verona Avenue becomes East Verona Avenue, making a brief reverse curve to the left before returning to its previous trajectory at School Street and becoming a four-lane divided highway east of there. US BUS 18/151/CR MV ends east of Verona at Exit 81 on US 18/151, but only with an eastbound on-ramp and westbound off-ramp.

Former

Hot Springs bypass

U.S. Route 18 Bypass (US 18 Byp.) was a bypass around the Hot Springs, South Dakota, city center. It began on the west side of Hot Springs at an intersection with US 18 and travels in a southeasterly direction. The highway skirted the western and southern edges of the city and meets South Dakota Highway 71 (SD 71) close to the point where the route turns east. It ended at US 18/US 385 in the southeastern corner of the city.

In 2021, SDDOT applied to have the route deleted, which was approved by AASHTO. The mainline of US 18 replaced the old bypass.

Milwaukee alternate route 

U.S. Highway 18 Alternate (US 18 Alt) is a former segment of US 18 within Milwaukee.

See also

References

 
18
18
S18
18